Piovano is an Italian surname. Notable people with the surname include:

 Federica Piovano, Italian golfer
 Luigi Piovano, Italian cellist and conductor
 Mafalda Piovano de Castro, Argentine politician

See also
 Piovani

Italian-language surnames